Triplax californica is a species of pleasing fungus beetle in the family Erotylidae.  It is found in North America.

Subspecies
 Triplax californica antica LeConte, 1861
 Triplax californica californica LeConte, 1854

References

Further reading

 
 
 

Erotylidae